Stephen Irvine (born 1959) is a Scottish musician, formerly a member of Lloyd Cole and the Commotions. Following the breakup of that band, he continued to work in the music industry and as a session musician worked with Del Amitri, Étienne Daho and Sarah Cracknell. He was part of the band Bloomsday (with fellow Commotions member Neil Clark), managed bands and worked with MTV.

References

1959 births
Living people
Scottish rock drummers